Muheeb Azat Issa Al-Balushi (born 23 January 1991), commonly known as Muheeb Al-Balushi, is an Omani footballer who plays for Al-Nasr S.C.S.C.

Club career statistics

International career

Muheeb is part of the first team squad of the Oman national football team. He was selected for the national team for the first time in 2009. He made his first appearance for Oman on 9 September 2009 in a friendly match against Qatar. He has made appearances in the 2012 WAFF Championship and the 2014 WAFF Championship.

References

External links
 
 
 
 

1991 births
Living people
People from Salalah
Omani footballers
Oman international footballers
Association football defenders
Al-Nasr SC (Salalah) players
Oman Professional League players
Omani people of Baloch descent
Footballers at the 2010 Asian Games
Asian Games competitors for Oman